Holy Family Catholic Regional Division No. 37 is a separate school authority within the Canadian province of Alberta operated out of Peace River.

See also 
List of school authorities in Alberta

References

External links 

 
School districts in Alberta